Herbert may refer to:

People

Individuals
 Herbert (musician), a pseudonym of Matthew Herbert

Name
 Herbert (given name)
 Herbert (surname)

Places

Antarctica
 Herbert Mountains, Coats Land
 Herbert Sound, Graham Land

Australia
 Herbert, Northern Territory, a rural locality
 Herbert, South Australia. former government town
 Division of Herbert, an electoral district in Queensland
 Herbert River, a river in Queensland
 County of Herbert, a cadastral unit in South Australia

Canada
 Herbert, Saskatchewan, Canada, a town
 Herbert Road, St. Albert, Canada

New Zealand
 Herbert, New Zealand, a town
 Mount Herbert (New Zealand)

United States
 Herbert, Illinois, an unincorporated community
 Herbert, Michigan, a former settlement
 Herbert Creek, a stream in South Dakota
 Herbert Island, Alaska

Arts, entertainment, and media

Fictional entities
 Herbert (Disney character)
 Herbert Pocket (Great Expectations character), Pip's close friend and roommate in the Charles Dickens novel Great Expectations
 Herbert West, title character of the H.P. Lovecraft short story Herbert West–Reanimator and the Re-Animator film series
 John Herbert, fictional character from the animated television series Family Guy

Other arts, entertainment, and media
 Herbert (film), a Bengali film directed by Suman Mukhopadhyay
 Herbert (video game), a 1988 platform game
 Herbert (album), a 2022 album by Ab-Soul

Other uses
 Alfred Herbert (company), British former machine tool manufacturing business
 Baron Herbert (disambiguation), several titles in the British peerage
 Herbert (grape), a hybrid grape variety
 Herbert Art Gallery and Museum
 USS Herbert (DD-160), a destroyer

See also 
 
'Erbert, a fictional schoolboy from The Bash Street Kids comic strip
Herb (disambiguation)
Herberts (disambiguation)
Herbie (disambiguation)
Heriberto
Hébert
Hubert
Justice Herbert (disambiguation)